Matroska is a project to create a container format that can hold an unlimited number of video, audio, picture, or subtitle tracks in one file. The Matroska Multimedia Container is similar in concept to other containers like AVI, MP4, or Advanced Systems Format (ASF), but is an open standard.

Matroska file extensions are .mkv for video (which may include subtitles or audio), .mk3d for stereoscopic video, .mka for audio-only files (which may include subtitles), and .mks for subtitles only.

History 

The project was announced on 6 December 2002 as a fork of the Multimedia Container Format (MCF), after disagreements between MCF lead developer Lasse Kärkkäinen and soon-to-be Matroska founder Steve Lhomme about the use of the Extensible Binary Meta Language (EBML) instead of a binary format. This coincided with a 6-month coding break by the MCF's lead developer for his military service, during which most of the community quickly migrated to the new project.

In 2010, it was announced that the WebM audio/video format would be based on a profile of the Matroska container format together with VP8 video and Vorbis audio.

On 31 October 2014, Microsoft confirmed that Windows 10 would support HEVC and Matroska out of the box, according to a statement from Gabriel Aul, the leader of Microsoft Operating Systems Group's Data and Fundamentals Team. Windows 10 Technical Preview Build 9860 added platform level support for HEVC and Matroska.

Name and logo 

"Matroska" is derived from matryoshka, the Russian word for the hollow wooden dolls which open to expose another smaller doll, that in turn opens to expose another doll, and so on. The logo writes it as "Matroška"; the letter š, an "s" with a caron over it, represents the "sh" sound in various languages.

Design 

The use of EBML allows extension for future format changes. The Matroska team has expressed some of their long-term goals on Doom9.org and Hydrogen Audio forums. Thus, the following are "goals", not necessarily existing features, of Matroska:

 Creating a modern, flexible, extensible, cross-platform multimedia container format
 Developing robust streaming support (both this format and the WebM subset are streamable)
 Developing a menu system similar to that of DVDs based on EBML (there is only a mostly empty draft)
 Developing a set of tools for the creation and editing of Matroska files (MKVToolNix, for example)
 Developing libraries to allow developers to add Matroska support to their applications (made open source by Matroska developers)
 Working with hardware manufacturers to include Matroska support in embedded multimedia devices

Development 

Matroska is supported by a non-profit organization (association loi 1901) in France, and the specifications are open to everyone. It is a royalty-free open standard that is free to use, and its technical specifications are available for private and commercial use. The Matroska development team licenses its libraries under the LGPL, with parsing and playback libraries available under BSD licenses.

Support 

Software supporting Matroska include all ffmpeg/libav-based ones, including, notably, mplayer, mpv, VLC, Foobar2000, Media Player Classic-HC, BS.player, Google Chrome, Mozilla Firefox, Blender, Kdenlive, Handbrake, MKVToolNix as well as YouTube (which uses WebM extensively).

Outside of ffmpeg, Windows 10 supports Matroska natively as well. Earlier versions relied on codec packs (like K-Lite Codec Pack or Combined Community Codec Pack) to integrate ffmpeg (via ffdshow) and other additions into Windows’ native DirectShow.

Apple macOS’s native QuickTime notably still lacks support.

See also 

 Comparison of video container formats
 List of open-source codecs
 MKVToolNix
 VLC media player

References

External links 

 
 Matroska Multimedia Container — Sustainability of Digital Formats: Planning for Library of Congress Collections

Computer-related introductions in 2002
Digital container formats
Free digital container formats
Open formats
Russian inventions